Andrei Vladimirovich Mokh (born 20 October 1965 in Tomsk) is a retired Russian football player.

International career
Mokh made his debut for USSR on 21 November 1990 in a friendly against United States. He also played one game for Russia on 24 March 1993 in a friendly against Israel.

References

External links
 
 Profile 

1965 births
Living people
Sportspeople from Tomsk
Association football defenders
Soviet footballers
Soviet Union international footballers
Russian footballers
Russia international footballers
Russian expatriate footballers
Russian expatriate sportspeople in Spain
Expatriate footballers in Spain
Soviet Top League players
La Liga players
Segunda División players
PFC CSKA Moscow players
FC Karpaty Lviv players
FC Dynamo Moscow players
FC Spartak Moscow players
RCD Espanyol footballers
CD Toledo players
Hércules CF players
CD Leganés players
Dual internationalists (football)